Jassaniyeh-ye Kuchek (also Romanized as Jassānīyeh-ye Kūchek) is a village in Anaqcheh Rural District, in the Central District of Ahvaz County, Khuzestan Province, Iran. At the 2006 census, its population was 887, in 141 families.

References 

Populated places in Ahvaz County